Association sportive de la SONABEL is a Burkinabé football club based in Ouagadougou and founded in 1990. They play their home games at the Stade de la SONABEL. The club and its stadium take their names from the Société Nationale d'électricité du Burkina Faso (SONABEL; the National Electricity Company of Burkina Faso).

The club's colors are violet and white.

Achievements
Burkinabé Premier League
Winner: 2021.
Runner-up: 2012.

Coupe du Faso
Winner:
Runner-up: 2011, 2013, 2016, 2019.

Burkinabé SuperCup
Winner: 2019, 2021.
Runner-up: 2013, 2016.

Performance in CAF competitions
CAF Champions League: 1 appearance
2022 - First Round

CAF Confederation Cup: 1 appearance
2014 – Preliminary Round

External links
Official website

Sonabel
Sport in Ouagadougou
1990 establishments in Burkina Faso